Jan Janků (born 10 August 1971 in Česká Lípa) is a former Czech high jumper.

His personal bests are 2.30 m indoors and 2.29 m outdoors. His younger brother Tomáš Janků is also a prominent high jumper.

He is married to Katerina Babova, a sister of the high jumper Jaroslav Bába. The couple has one son, Jan Junior, born in 2007.

Achievements

References
 

1971 births
Living people
People from Česká Lípa
Czech male high jumpers
Sportspeople from the Liberec Region